Spring Garden Elementary School may refer to:

 Spring Garden Elementary School, Spring Garden School District 178, Mount Vernon, Illinois
 Spring Garden Elementary School, Carroll County Public Schools, Hampstead, Maryland
 Spring Garden Elementary School, Nutley, New Jersey
 Spring Garden School, Philadelphia, Pennsylvania
 Spring Garden Elementary School, Bethlehem Area School District, Bethlehem, Pennsylvania
 Spring Garden Elementary School, Hurst-Euless-Bedford Independent School District, Bedford, Texas